The Chikaskia River (usually pronounced chi-KAS-kee-uh but often pronounced chi-KAS-kee in southern Kansas) is a  tributary of the Salt Fork of the Arkansas River in southern Kansas and northern Oklahoma in the United States.  Via the Salt Fork and Arkansas rivers, it is part of the watershed of the Mississippi River.

Course
The Chikaskia River begins as an intermittent stream in southwestern Pratt County, Kansas and initially flows eastwardly into Kingman County, where it turns southeastward for the remainder of its course through Harper and Sumner counties in Kansas and Grant and Kay counties in Oklahoma.

Variant names
The United States Board on Geographic Names settled on "Chikaskia River" as the river's official name and spelling in 1897.  According to the Geographic Names Information System, the river has also been known as "Chicaskia River", "Sha wa cas kah River", and "Sha-wa-cas-kah River."

Fishing

The Chikaskia River and the Salt Fork are known for their large catfish.

See also
List of Kansas rivers
List of Oklahoma rivers
USS Chikaskia (AO-54) is named after the river

References

External links

Rivers of Kansas
Rivers of Oklahoma
Rivers of Grant County, Oklahoma
Rivers of Harper County, Kansas
Rivers of Kay County, Oklahoma
Rivers of Kingman County, Kansas
Rivers of Pratt County, Kansas
Rivers of Sumner County, Kansas